In algebraic geometry, local cohomology is an algebraic analogue of relative cohomology. Given a function (more generally, a section of a quasicoherent sheaf) defined on an open subset of an algebraic variety (or scheme), local cohomology measures the obstruction to extending that function to a larger domain. The local cohomology module  (where  is the coordinate ring of ) detects this in the nonvanishing of a cohomology class .

Outside of algebraic geometry, local cohomology has found applications in commutative algebra, combinatorics, and certain kinds of partial differential equations.

Definition
In the most general geometric form of the theory, sections  are considered of a sheaf  of abelian groups, on a topological space , with support in a closed subset , The derived functors of  form local cohomology groups

The closed subscheme Y is defined by an ideal I. In this situation, the functor ΓY(F) corresponds to the I-torsion functor, a union of annihilators

i.e., the elements of M which are annihilated by some power of I. As a right derived functor, the ith local cohomology module with respect to I is the ith cohomology group  of the chain complex  obtained from taking the I-torsion part  of an injective resolution  of the module . Because  consists of R-modules and R-module homomorphisms, the local cohomology groups each have the natural structure of an R-module.

The I-torsion part  may alternatively be described as

and for this reason, the local cohomology of an R-module M agrees with a direct limit of Ext modules,

It follows from either of these definitions that  would be unchanged if  were replaced by another ideal having the same radical. It also follows that local cohomology does not depend on any choice of generators for I, a fact which becomes relevant in the following definition involving the Čech complex.

Using Koszul and Čech complexes 
The derived functor definition of local cohomology requires an injective resolution of the module , which can make it inaccessible for use in explicit computations. The Čech complex is seen as more practical in certain contexts. , for example, state that they "essentially ignore" the "problem of actually producing any one of these [injective] kinds of resolutions for a given module" prior to presenting the Čech complex definition of local cohomology, and  describes Čech cohomology as "giv[ing] a practical method for computing cohomology of quasi-coherent sheaves on a scheme." and as being "well suited for computations."

The Čech complex can be defined as a colimit of Koszul complexes  where  generate . The local cohomology modules can be described as:

A non-zero map in the colimit of the  sets contains maps from the all but finitely many Koszul complexes, and which are not annihilated by some element in the ideal. 

This colimit of Koszul complexes is isomorphic to the Čech complex, denoted , below.  

Basic properties
Since local cohomology is defined as derived functor, for any short exact sequence of R-modules , there is, by definition, a natural long exact sequence in local cohomology

 

There is also a long exact sequence of sheaf cohomology linking the ordinary sheaf cohomology of X and of the open set  U = X \Y, with the local cohomology modules. For a quasicoherent sheaf F defined on X, this has the form

If , this leads to an exact sequence

where the middle map is the restriction of sections. The target of this restriction map is also referred to as the ideal transform. For n ≥ 1, there are isomorphisms

Because of the above isomorphism with sheaf cohomology, local cohomology can be used to express a number of meaningful topological constructions on the scheme  in purely algebraic terms. For example, there is a natural analogue in local cohomology of the Mayer–Vietoris sequence with respect to a pair of open sets U and V in X, given by the complements of the closed subschemes corresponding to a pair of ideal I and J, respectively. This sequence has the form

for any -module .

Graded local cohomology and projective geometry

All of the basic properties of local cohomology expressed in this article are compatible with the graded structure.

The case where  is the ideal generated by all elements of positive degree (sometimes called the irrelevant ideal) is particularly special, due to its relationship with projective geometry. In this case, there is an isomorphism

This isomorphism is graded, giving

in all degrees .

This isomorphism relates local cohomology with the global cohomology of projective schemes. For example, the Castelnuovo–Mumford regularity can be formulated using local cohomology as

where  denotes the highest degree  such that . Local cohomology can be used to prove certain upper bound results concerning the regularity.

Examples

Top local cohomology

This fraction corresponds to a nonzero element of  if and only if there is no  such that . For example, if , then

Examples of H1
If  is known (where ), the module  can sometimes be computed explicitly using the sequence

In the following examples,  is any field.

Relation to invariants of modules
The dimension dimR(M) of a module (defined as the Krull dimension of its support) provides an upper bound for local cohomology modules:

If R is local and M finitely generated, then this bound is sharp, i.e., .

The depth (defined as the maximal length of a regular M-sequence; also referred to as the grade of M) provides a sharp lower bound, i.e., it is the smallest integer n such that

These two bounds together yield a characterisation of Cohen–Macaulay modules over local rings: they are precisely those modules where  vanishes for all but one n.

Local duality
The local duality theorem is a local analogue of Serre duality. For a Cohen-Macaulay local ring  of dimension  that is a homomorphic image of a Gorenstein local ring (for example, if  is complete), it states that the natural pairing

In terms of the Matlis duality functor , the local duality theorem may be expressed as the following isomorphism.

The statement is simpler when , which is equivalent to the hypothesis that  is Gorenstein. This is the case, for example, if  is regular.

Applications
The initial applications were to analogues of the Lefschetz hyperplane theorems. In general such theorems state that homology or cohomology is supported on a hyperplane section of an algebraic variety, except for some 'loss' that can be controlled. These results applied to the algebraic fundamental group and to the Picard group.

The latter asserts that for two projective varieties V and W in Pr over an algebraically closed field, the connectedness dimension of Z = V ∩ W (i.e., the minimal dimension of a closed subset T of Z that has to be removed from Z so that the complement Z \ T is disconnected) is bound by
c(Z) ≥ dim V + dim W − r − 1.
For example, Z is connected if dim V + dim W > r.

In polyhedral geometry, a key ingredient of Stanley’s 1975 proof of the simplicial form of McMullen’s Upper bound theorem involves showing that the Stanley-Reisner ring of the corresponding simplicial complex is Cohen-Macaulay, and local cohomology is an important tool in this computation, via Hochster’s formula.

See also 

 Local homology - gives topological analogue and computation of local homology of the cone of a space
 Faltings' annihilator theorem

Notes

Introductory Reference 
 Huneke, Craig; Taylor, Amelia, Lectures on Local Cohomology

References

 Book review by Hartshorne

Sheaf theory
Topological methods of algebraic geometry
Cohomology theories
Commutative algebra
Duality theories